Sarah Abrevaya Stein is a prominent American historian of Sephardic Jewry.

She is the  Sady and Ludwig Kahn director of the Alan D. Leve Center for Jewish Studies, professor of history, and holder of the Viterbi Family Chair in Mediterranean Jewish Studies at UCLA. And author of Family Papers: A Sephardic Journey Through the Twentieth Century.

Her 2008 book Plumes: ostrich feathers, Jews, and a lost world of global commerce won the Sami Rohr Prize for Jewish Literature.

Books
 Family Papers: A Sephardic Journey Through the Twentieth Century (Farrar, Straus and Giroux, 2019)
 The Holocaust and North Africa (Stanford University Press, 2019)
  A Jewish Voice from Ottoman Salonica: The Ladino Memoir of Sa'adi Besalel a-Levi co-authored with Aron Rodrigue and Isaac Jerusalmi (Stanford University Press, 2012)
 Plumes: ostrich feathers, Jews, and a lost world of global commerce (Yale University Press, 2008)
 Making Jews modern : the Yiddish and Ladino press in the Russian and Ottoman Empires (Indiana University Press, 2004)
 Ottomanism in Ladino (European University Institute, 2002)
Extraterritorial Dreams: European Citizenship, Sephardi Jews, and the Ottoman Twentieth Century (University of Chicago Press, 2016)

Awards 
 2016: National Jewish Book Award in the Sephardic Culture category for Extraterritorial Dreams

References

Living people
University of California, Los Angeles faculty
Year of birth missing (living people)
American women historians
Historians from California
21st-century American women